Prosthogonimus is a genus of trematodes belonging to the family Prosthogonimidae.

The species of this genus are found in Europe, Northern America, Southeastern Asia, Australia.

Species:

Prosthogonimus anatinus 
Prosthogonimus crecci 
Prosthogonimus cuneatus 
Prosthogonimus dollfusi 
Prosthogonimus gracilis 
Prosthogonimus guiyangensis 
Prosthogonimus hyderabadensis 
Prosthogonimus ketupi 
Prosthogonimus limani 
Prosthogonimus longus 
Prosthogonimus macrorchis 
Prosthogonimus malaysiae 
Prosthogonimus mesolecithus 
Prosthogonimus orientalis 
Prosthogonimus ovatus 
Prosthogonimus pellucidus 
Prosthogonimus querquedulae 
Prosthogonimus robdollfusi 
Prosthogonimus ryjikowi 
Prosthogonimus singhi 
Prosthogonimus skrjabini 
Prosthogonimus sobolevi 
Prosthogonimus vitellatus 
Schistogonimus rarus

References

Platyhelminthes